Joseph Lewis (born 26 July 1992) is a British ice hockey player for ESV Kaufbeuren and the British national team.

He represented Great Britain at the 2019 IIHF World Championship.

References

External links

1992 births
British expatriate ice hockey people
Welsh expatriate sportspeople in Germany
EC Bad Tölz players
ESV Kaufbeuren players
Füchse Duisburg players
Heilbronner Falken players
Living people
Starbulls Rosenheim players
Sportspeople from Newport, Wales
Swindon Wildcats players
Welsh ice hockey forwards
Expatriate ice hockey players in Germany